Pwadawgyi was the chief queen consort of King Htilominlo of the Pagan Dynasty of Myanmar (Burma). Her personal name is lost to history. Pwadawgyi simply means "Royal Grandmother". She was a great granddaughter of King Sithu I. She and Htilominlo had two children named Theinpatei and Taya Mun. Taya Mun died young.

References

Bibliography
 
 
 
 

Chief queens consort of Pagan
13th-century Burmese women